Johan Brunström and Frederik Nielsen were the defending champions but only Nielsen chose to defend his title, partnering Noah Rubin. Nielsen lost in the first round to Blaž Rola and Grega Žemlja.

Matt Reid and John-Patrick Smith won the title after defeating Quentin Halys and Dennis Novikov 6–1, 6–2 in the final.

Seeds

Draw

References
 Main Draw
 Qualifying Draw

Tiburon Challenger - Doubles